Dennis Marineau (born 19 December 1962) is a Canadian bobsledder. He competed in the two man and the four man events at the 1992 Winter Olympics.

References

1962 births
Living people
Canadian male bobsledders
Olympic bobsledders of Canada
Bobsledders at the 1992 Winter Olympics
Sportspeople from Calgary